Orin J. Childress (born December 6, 1976) is a former American football linebacker who played one season with the New York Giants of the National Football League (NFL). He was drafted by the Giants in the seventh round of the 1999 NFL Draft. He played college football at Clemson University and attended McGavock High School in Nashville, Tennessee. Childress was also a member of the Amsterdam Admirals, San Francisco 49ers and Carolina Panthers.

Professional career
Childress was selected by the New York Giants of the NFL with the 231st pick in the 1999 NFL Draft. He appeared in four games for the Giants during the 1999 season. He played for the Amsterdam Admirals during the 2000 NFL Europe season. Childress was released by the Giants on August 28, 2000 and signed to the team's practice squad on August 31, 2000. He was released by the Giants on November 17, 2000. He was signed off waivers by the NFL's San Francisco 49ers on November 20, 2000. Childress was signed off the 49ers' practice squad by the Carolina Panthers on December 15, 2000. He was released by the Panthers on August 31, 2001.

References

External links
Just Sports Stats
NFL Draft Scout

Living people
1976 births
American football linebackers
African-American players of American football
Clemson Tigers football players
New York Giants players
Amsterdam Admirals players
San Francisco 49ers players
Carolina Panthers players
Players of American football from Nashville, Tennessee
People from Hermitage, Tennessee
21st-century African-American sportspeople
20th-century African-American sportspeople